Sanuk may refer to:

Sanuk, a Thai word meaning "fun"; see the entry for สนุก at Wiktionary
 Sanuk, a footwear brand of Deckers Outdoor Corporation
Sanuk, Iran, a village in Iran